The Netherlands participated in the Eurovision Song Contest 2007 with the song "On Top of the World" written by Tjeerd Oosterhuis, Martin Gijzemijter and Maarten ten Hove. The song was performed by Edsilia Rombley, who was internally selected by the Dutch broadcaster Nederlandse Omroep Stichting (NOS) to represent the Netherlands at the 2007 contest in Helsinki, Finland after previously representing the country in the Eurovision Song Contest in 1998 where she placed third with the song "Hemel en aarde". Edsilia Rombley's appointment as the Dutch representative was announced on 16 December 2006. Three potential songs were presented to the public on 11 February 2007 during the special programme Mooi! Weer het Nationaal Songfestival where the selected song "Nooit meer zonder jou" was announced. The song was later translated from Dutch to English for the Eurovision Song Contest and was titled "On Top of the World".

The Netherlands competed in the semi-final of the Eurovision Song Contest which took place on 10 May 2007. Performing during the show in position 10, "On Top of the World" was not announced among the top 10 entries of the semi-final and therefore did not qualify to compete in the final. It was later revealed that the Netherlands placed twenty-first out of the 28 participating countries in the semi-final with 38 points.

Background 

Following the introduction of semi-finals for the 2004 contest, the Netherlands had featured in only one final. The Dutch least successful result has been last place, which they have achieved on four occasions, most recently in the 1968 contest.

The Dutch national broadcaster, Nederlandse Omroep Stichting (NOS), broadcasts the event within the Netherlands and organises the selection process for the nation's entry. The Netherlands has used various methods to select the Dutch entry in the past, such as the Nationaal Songfestival, a live televised national final to choose the performer, song or both to compete at Eurovision. However, internal selections have also been held on occasion. In 2006, NOS has organised Nationaal Songfestival in order to select the Dutch entry for the contest, however for 2007, the broadcaster opted to select the Dutch entry through an internal selection.

Before Eurovision

Internal selection 

Following Treble's failure to qualify to the final in 2006 with the song "Amambanda", the Dutch broadcaster internally selected both the artist and song for the Eurovision Song Contest 2007. On 16 December 2006, NOS announced during the Nederland 1 programme Mooi! Weer De Leeuw, hosted by Paul de Leeuw, that they had selected singer Edsilia Rombley to represent the Netherlands at the 2007 contest. Edsilia Rombley had previously represented the Netherlands at the Eurovision Song Contest 1998, placing fourth with the song "Hemel en aarde". During her interview on Mooi! Weer De Leeuw, Rombley revealed that she would perform three to four songs from her upcoming album Meer dan ooit during a special broadcast of the programme, one of them which she would select in consultation with record company Universal Music as her Eurovision song.

On 11 February 2007, Edsilia Rombley performed three songs during the programme Mooi! Weer het Nationaal Songfestival: "Meer dan ooit" written by Tjeerd Oosterhuis, Martin Gijzemijter and Ellert Driessen, and "Een keer meer dan jij" and "Nooit meer zonder jou" written by Oosterhuis and Gijzemijter. "Nooit meer zonder jou" was ultimately announced as Rombley's Eurovision entry, while "Een keer meer dan jij" and "Meer dan ooit" placed second and third, respectively. A panel consisting of Cornald Maas, Mikko Jokela, Martijn van Raaij, Marlies van Zeeland, Kees van Twist and Johannes Snippe provided feedback regarding the songs, while past Dutch Eurovision entrants Milly Scott (1966), Ben Cramer (1973), Bill van Dijk (1982), Justine Pelmelay (1989), Maywood (1990), Mrs. Einstein (1997), Linda Wagenmakers (2000) and Glennis Grace (2005) were also present during the show.

Preparation 
Even though Edsilia Rombley had previously expressed her wish to sing in the Dutch language, the singer revealed on 5 March during NOS Journaal that she would perform the English version of "Nooit meer zonder jou" at the Eurovision Song Contest 2007, titled "On Top of the World" with lyrics written by Tjeerd Oosterhuis, Martin Gijzemijter and Maarten ten Hove. "On Top of the World" premiered on 15 March during the Radio 2 programme Gouden Uren, hosted by Daniël Dekker.

At Eurovision 

According to Eurovision rules, all nations with the exceptions of the host country, the "Big Four" (France, Germany, Spain and the United Kingdom) and the ten highest placed finishers in the 2006 contest are required to qualify from the semi-final on 10 May 2007 in order to compete for the final on 12 May 2007; the top ten countries from the semi-final progress to the final. On 12 March 2007, a special allocation draw was held which determined the running order for the semi-final and the Netherlands was set to perform in position 9, following the entry from Moldova and before the entry from Albania.

The semi-final and the final was broadcast in the Netherlands on Nederland 1 with commentary by Cornald Maas; Paul de Leeuw was also a commentator for the final. The Dutch spokesperson, who announced the Dutch votes during the final, was Paul de Leeuw and Edsilia Rombley.

Semi-final 
Edsilia Rombley took part in technical rehearsals on 3 and 5 May, followed by dress rehearsals on 9 and 10 May. The Dutch performance featured Edsilia Rombley standing on a small podium wearing an orange dress and performing together with four female dancers, all of them which also performed backing vocals, and a male dancer. The stage was dark in the beginning but later displayed red and yellow colours with dark leaves set against on the LED screens. The four female backing performers that joined Edsilia Rombley were Charida Jonkhart, Martine Hauwert, Merel Schaftenaar and Thirza Solcer, while the male dancer was Bram Blankestijn.

At the end of the show, the Netherlands was not announced among the top 10 entries in the semi-final and therefore failed to qualify to compete in the final. It was later revealed that the Netherlands placed twenty-first in the semi-final, receiving a total of 38 points.

Voting 
Below is a breakdown of points awarded to the Netherlands and awarded by the Netherlands in the semi-final and grand final of the contest. The nation awarded its 12 points to Turkey in the semi-final and the final of the contest.

Points awarded to the Netherlands

Points awarded by the Netherlands

References

2007
Countries in the Eurovision Song Contest 2007
Eurovision